Chotěvice is a municipality and village in Trutnov District in the Hradec Králové Region of the Czech Republic. It has about 1,000 inhabitants.

References

Villages in Trutnov District